Life Begins at Midnight (Spanish:La vida empieza a medianoche ) is a 1944 Spanish comedy film written and directed by Juan de Orduña and starring Marta Santaolalla, Armando Calvo and Julia Lajos.

The movie is based on the novel written by Luisa-Maria Linares.

Cast
 Marta Santaolalla as Silvia
 Armando Calvo as Ricardo
 Julia Lajos as María Linz
 José María Seoane as Álvaro
 José Isbert as El abuelo
 María Isbert as Clarita
 Consuelo de Nieva as Marcela
 José Prada as Juan
 Manuel Requena as Gorito
 Luis Sanz as Guillermito
 Manuel Soto as Director del hotel
 Antonio Prada
 Xan das Bolas
 Dolores Castillejo

References

Bibliography
 Bentley, Bernard. A Companion to Spanish Cinema. Boydell & Brewer, 2008.

External links
 

1944 films
1944 comedy films
Spanish comedy films
1940s Spanish-language films
Spanish black-and-white films
Spain in fiction
Films directed by Juan de Orduña
Cifesa films
Films scored by Juan Quintero Muñoz
1940s Spanish films